Cristian Rodríguez Pérez (born 15 March 1996) is a Spanish professional footballer who plays for CD Castellón as a central midfielder.

Club career
Born in Jerez de la Frontera, Cádiz, Andalusia, Rodríguez was an Atlético Sanluqueño CF youth graduate. He first appeared with the reserves in the 2013–14 season in the regional leagues, and made his first team debut on 15 March 2014 by playing the last 12 minutes of a 2–1 Segunda División B home win against La Roda CF.

On 25 August 2016, after already establishing himself as a starter for the Verdiblancos, Rodríguez joined Atlético Madrid and was assigned to the B-team in Tercera División. On 28 March 2018, after achieving promotion to the third division in 2016–17, he renewed his contract until 2020.

On 19 July 2019, Rodríguez agreed to a four-year deal with Extremadura UD in Segunda División. He made his professional debut on 1 October, starting and scoring the second in a 2–0 home win against Elche CF.

On 18 August 2020, after suffering relegation, Rodríguez moved to fellow second division side Málaga CF on loan for the season. On 30 August of the following year, he signed a permanent deal with SD Ponferradina in the same category.

References

External links

1996 births
Living people
Footballers from Jerez de la Frontera
Spanish footballers
Association football midfielders
Segunda División players
Primera Federación players
Segunda División B players
Tercera División players
Divisiones Regionales de Fútbol players
Atlético Sanluqueño CF players
Atlético Madrid B players
Extremadura UD footballers
Málaga CF players
SD Ponferradina players
CD Castellón footballers